Rip the Runway is an annual fashion show and music show broadcast by BET, held at the Hammerstein Ballroom in New York City.

2005
The first Rip the Runway show was hosted by Fonzworth Bentley and Eva Pigford.

2006
The 2006 Rip the Runway show was hosted by LL Cool J and Gabrielle Union.

2007
The 2007 Rip the Runway show was hosted by Ciara and Chris Brown.

2008
The 2008 Rip the Runway show was hosted by Nelly and Lauren London.

Performers
 Day26
 Cheri Dennis
 Missy Elliott
 N.E.R.D.
 T-Pain
 Flo Rida
 Snoop
 Trey Songz
 Webbie

2009
The 2009 Rip the Runway show was hosted by Derek Luke and Joy Bryant.

Performers
 T.I.
 The-Dream
 Ron Browz
 GS Boyz
 Mavado
 Yung LA
 Young Dro
 Protege
 Bobby Valentino
 Busta Rhymes
 Fabolous
 Keri Hilson

2010
The 2010 Rip the Runway show was hosted by Nicki Minaj and Pooch Hall.

Performers
 Ludacris
 Estelle
 Trina
 Roscoe Dash
 Janelle Monáe
 B.o.B
 Bruno Mars
 Roscoe Dash
 Soulja Boy

2011
The 2011 Rip the Runway show was hosted by Mehcad Brooks and Selita Ebanks.

Performer
 Melanie Fiona
 Keri Hilson
 Miguel
 Lloyd
 Wiz Khalifa
 Lil Wayne
 Drake

2012
The 2012 Rip the Runway show was hosted by Selita Ebanks and Pooch Hall. (This is the second time the two host).

Performer
 B.o.B
 Meek Mill
 Diggy Simmons
 Jeremih
 Wale
 Estelle
 Lil' Kim

2013
The 2013 Rip the Runway show was hosted by Kelly Rowland and Boris Kodjoe

Performers
Meek Mill
Rick Ross
Jaden Smith
Luke James
Trinidad James
Sevyn Streeter
Omarion
Watch the Duck

External links
 Official BET website
 Rip the Runway website

References 

BET original programming
Fashion events in the United States
Events in New York City
Annual events in New York City
Music festivals in New York City
Culture of New York City
American fashion
2005 establishments in New York City
Recurring events established in 2005